Kuzovatovsky District  is an administrative and municipal district (raion), one of the twenty-one in Ulyanovsk Oblast, Russia. It is located in the center of the oblast. Its administrative center is the urban locality (a work settlement) of Kuzovatovo. Population: 22,377 (2010 Census);  The population of Kuzovatovo accounts for 35.8% of the district's total population.

References

Notes

Sources

Districts of Ulyanovsk Oblast